The following radio stations broadcast on FM frequency 95.8 MHz:

China (mainland) 
 CNR The Voice of China in Nanjing, Shenzhen, Huizhou and Sanming

Hong Kong 
 Transfer CNR The Voice of China

Indonesia
 Prambors FM in DI Yogyakarta

Malaysia
 Fly FM in Klang Valley

New Zealand
 Flava in Auckland

Singapore
 Capital 95.8FM

United Kingdom
 Capital London in London

Zimbabwe
 95.8 Central Radio in Gweru

References

Lists of radio stations by frequency